Jiantang or Gyaitang is a town in northern Yunnan, seat of Shangri-La County and Dêqên Tibetan Autonomous Prefecture.

Climate
Jiantang has a subtropical highland climate (Cwb) with little to no rainfall from November to April and moderate to heavy rainfall from May to October.

References

Township-level divisions of Dêqên Tibetan Autonomous Prefecture